Wialki is a townsite in the eastern Wheatbelt region of Western Australia. It is situated between Beacon and Bonnie Rock, in the shires of Mount Marshall and Mukinbudin.

Wialki was originally a siding on the Burakin to Bonnie Rock railway extension planned to pass through the area in 1929; the district surveyor suggested the station should be named Datjoin but the Railway department chose the name Wialki after the Aboriginal name of a nearby soak. The station was named in 1930 and the townsite was gazetted in 1933.
The surrounding areas produce wheat and other cereal crops. A second bulk wheat bin was constructed in town in 1940 just as the first bulk bin was filled. The town is a receival site for Cooperative Bulk Handling.

References

External links 

Towns in Western Australia
Wheatbelt (Western Australia)
Grain receival points of Western Australia